Favartia concavoptera is a species of sea snail, a marine gastropod mollusk in the family Muricidae, the murex snails or rock snails.

Description
The shell grows to a length of 22 mm.

Distribution
This species occurs in the Pacific Ocean off the Philippines.

References

 Kosuge S. (1980) Descriptions of three new species of the family Muricidae (Gastropoda Muricacea). Bulletin of the Institute of Malacology, Tokyo 1(4): 53-56, pls 14-15
 Merle, D., Garrigues, B. & Pointier, J.P. (2022). Fossil and Recent Muricidae of the world: Part Muricopsinae. Harxheim: ConchBooks. 528 pp.

External links
 

Gastropods described in 1980
Favartia